Worcester County is a county in the U.S. state of Massachusetts. At the 2020 census, the population was 862,111, making it the second-most populous county in Massachusetts. It is also the largest county in Massachusetts by geographic area. The largest city and traditional shire town is Worcester, Massachusetts. Worcester County is part of the Worcester, MA-CT metropolitan statistical area and as the Boston-Worcester-Providence, MA-RI-NH-CT combined statistical area.

History

Worcester County was formed from the eastern portion of colonial Hampshire County, the western portion of the original Middlesex County and the extreme western portion of the original Suffolk County. When the government of Worcester County was established on April 2, 1731, Worcester was chosen as its shire town (later known as a county seat). From that date until the dissolution of the county government, it was the only county seat. Because of the size of the county, there were fifteen attempts over 140 years to split the county into two counties, but without success.

Initially, Lancaster was proposed as the seat of the northern county; later, Petersham was proposed once and Fitchburg was proposed repeatedly, most recently in 1903. Perhaps as a concession, in August 1884 the Worcester County Registry of Deeds was split in two, with the Worcester Northern registry placed in Fitchburg.

Geography

It is the largest county in Massachusetts by area. The county is larger geographically than the entire state of Rhode Island even including Rhode Island's water ocean limit boundaries.  The county constitutes Central Massachusetts, separating the Greater Springfield area from the Greater Boston area. It stretches from the northern to the southern border of the state. The geographic center of Massachusetts is in Rutland.

Worcester County is one of two Massachusetts counties that borders three different neighboring states; the other being Berkshire County. They are also the only two counties to touch both the northern and southern state lines.

Adjacent counties

Cheshire County, New Hampshire - north
Hillsborough County, New Hampshire - north/northeast
Middlesex County, Massachusetts - east/northeast
Norfolk County, Massachusetts - east/southeast
Providence County, Rhode Island - south/southeast
Windham County, Connecticut - south
Tolland County, Connecticut - south/southwest
Hampden County, Massachusetts - west/southwest
Hampshire County, Massachusetts - west
Franklin County, Massachusetts - west/northwest

National protected areas
 Blackstone River Valley National Historical Park (part)
 Oxbow National Wildlife Refuge (part)

Demographics

As of the 2020 census, 862,111 people resided in Worcester County.

2000 census
At the 2000 census there were 750,963 people, 283,927 households, and 192,502 families in the county. There were 298,159 housing units at an average density of 197 per square mile (76/km2). The racial makeup of the county was 89.61% White, 2.73% Black or African American, 0.25% Native American, 2.62% Asian, 0.04% Pacific Islander, 2.93% from other races, and 1.82% from two or more races.  6.77%. were Hispanic or Latino of any race. 15.9% were of Irish, 12.3% Italian, 11.7% French, 8.0% French Canadian, 8.0% English, 5.6% Polish and 5.0% American ancestry according to Census 2000. 85.1% spoke English, 6.1% Spanish and 1.9% French as their first language.

Of the 283,927 households 33.60% had children under the age of 18 living with them, 52.50% were married couples living together, 11.40% had a female householder with no husband present, and 32.20% were non-families. 26.20% of households were one person and 10.40% were one person aged 65 or older.  The average household size was 2.56 and the average family size was 3.11.

The age distribution was 25.60% under the age of 18, 8.40% from 18 to 24, 31.10% from 25 to 44, 21.80% from 45 to 64, and 13.00% 65 or older.  The median age was 36 years. For every 100 females, there were 95.50 males.  For every 100 females age 18 and over, there were 92.10 males.

The median household income was $47,874 and the median family income  was $58,394. Males had a median income of $42,261 versus $30,516 for females. The per capita income for the county was $22,983.  About 6.80% of families and 9.20% of the population were below the poverty line, including 11.30% of those under age 18 and 9.50% of those age 65 or over.

2010 census
At the 2010 census, there were 798,552 people, 303,080 households, and 202,602 families in the county. The racial makeup of the county was 85.6% white, 4.2% black or African American, 4.0% Asian, 0.2% American Indian, 3.6% from other races, and 2.3% from two or more races. Those of Hispanic or Latino origin made up 9.4% of the population. In terms of ancestry, 22.2% were Irish, 15.1% were French as well as 6.7% French Canadians, 14.4% were Italian, 11.7% were English, 7.0% were Polish, 6.9% were German, and 3.2% were American.

Of the 303,080 households, 33.7% had children under the age of 18 living with them, 50.0% were married couples living together, 12.2% had a female householder with no husband present, 33.2% were non-families, and 26.2% of households were made up of individuals. The average household size was 2.55 and the average family size was 3.09. The median age was 39.2 years.

The median household income was $64,152 and the median family income  was $79,121. Males had a median income of $56,880 versus $42,223 for females. The per capita income for the county was $30,557. About 6.9% of families and 9.5% of the population were below the poverty line, including 12.1% of those under age 18 and 9.0% of those age 65 or over.

Demographic breakdown by town

Income

The ranking of unincorporated communities that are included on the list are reflective of the census designated locations and villages were included as cities or towns. Data is from the 2007-2011 American Community Survey 5-Year Estimates.

Government and politics

Worcester County is one of the 8 (of the total of 14) Massachusetts counties that have had no county government or county commissioners since July 1, 1998, when county functions were assumed by state agencies at local option following a change in state law. The county has an elected county sheriff, county prosecutor, and court officials, administered under the state department of public safety. The state correctional system in the county is known as the Worcester County Jail or "House of Corrections" at West Boylston, and the Worcester County District courts (state administered) are housed at Worcester, Fitchburg and other district courts within county boundaries. The Worcester County district attorney is a county-wide position even though the district includes one town from a neighboring county. In Massachusetts, Sheriffs have more limited roles than most states and are responsible for corrections, court service and bailiffs and jail release programs. County Sheriffs in Massachusetts are elected to six-year terms. The Worcester County Sheriff is Lewis Evangelidis, (R), and the Worcester County District Attorney is Joseph Early Jr. (D).(see the info-box for elected officials at county level). The Worcester County Conservation District has countywide boundaries. The county has a regional planning commission.

Massachusetts law allows regional compacts, traditional counties and other governmental entities. Traditional County governments in the state include: Norfolk, Bristol, Dukes, Nantucket, and Plymouth Counties. Barnstable County, which is Cape Cod, functions as a modern regional county government. Suffolk County which is mainly Boston is under the Boston City Council.  The Massachusetts General Laws describe this relationship of county government and the options for abolishing county governments and/or chartering regional governmental compacts in subchapter 34 B. Four other new county compacts have been created by the state legislature and these are in Hampshire, Franklin, Barnstable Counties, and a regional planning council level for Berkshire County.  Thus 9 of 14 Counties have some form of county regional governments.  Worcester County could exercise that option if it chooses for example, for public safety and, or preparedness due to its rather large geography, by a request to and a special act of the legislature, by local referendum or by one of three mechanisms. See the references for the state statute, and the League of Women Voters link.

Like all of Massachusetts, Worcester County is a Democratic stronghold in presidential elections.

|}

Communities

Cities
Fitchburg
Gardner
Leominster
Southbridge
Worcester (traditional county seat)

Towns

Ashburnham
Athol
Auburn
Barre
Berlin
Blackstone
Bolton
Boylston
Brookfield
Charlton
Clinton
Douglas
Dudley
East Brookfield
Grafton
Hardwick
Harvard
Holden
Hopedale
Hubbardston
Lancaster
Leicester
Lunenburg
Mendon
Milford
Millbury
Millville
New Braintree
North Brookfield
Northborough
Northbridge
Oakham
Oxford
Paxton
Petersham
Phillipston
Princeton
Royalston
Rutland
Shrewsbury
Southborough
Spencer
Sterling
Sturbridge
Sutton
Templeton
Upton
Uxbridge
Warren
Webster
West Boylston
West Brookfield
Westborough
Westminster
Winchendon

Census-designated places

Athol
Baldwinville
Barre
Brookfield
Clinton
Cordaville
Devens
East Brookfield
East Douglas
Fiskdale
Hopedale
Lunenburg
Milford
North Brookfield
Northborough
Oxford
Petersham
Rutland
South Ashburnham
South Lancaster
Spencer
Sturbridge
Upton
Warren
Webster
West Brookfield
West Warren
Westborough
Whitinsville
Winchendon

Other unincorporated communities

Chapinville
Cherry Valley
East Millbury
East Princeton
Farnumsville (also called South Grafton)
Fisherville
Gilbertville
Hardwick
Ironstone (also known as South Uxbridge)
Jefferson
Leicester Center
Linwood
Manchuag
Morningdale
North Grafton
North Uxbridge
Oakdale
Old Furnace
Otter River
Pitcherville
Rochdale
Rockdale
Saundersville
Spindleville
Still River
Stoneville
Union Chapel
West Sutton
West Upton
Whalom
Wheelockville
Wheelwright
Winchendon Springs

Ghost town
Dana, disincorporated due to the creation of the Quabbin Reservoir

Notable people
 Louisa May Alcott, novelist, daughter of Amos Alcott
 Johnny Appleseed, real name Jonathan Chapman
 Mike Barnicle, newspaper writer
 Clara Barton, founder of the American Red Cross
 Michael Beasley, NBA player, high school All-American; attended Notre Dame Preparatory School
 Robert Benchley, writer, theater critic, actor, humorist, and member of the Algonquin Round Table
 H. Jon Benjamin, actor and comedian
 Ezra T. Benson, Mormon pioneer, missionary, Quorum of Twelve, and Utah territorial legislator
 Ken Bouchard and Ron Bouchard, NASCAR drivers
 Luther Burbank, horticulturalist; developed russet potato used in French fries by McDonald's
 William Cullen Bryant, poet, journalist and editor of the New York Evening Post
 Effingham Capron, woolen and cotton mill scion who liberated slaves from the 1830s; led local, state and US anti slavery societies
 George M. Cohan, entertainer, playwright, composer, lyricist, actor, singer, dancer, director
 Robert Cormier, novelist and columnist
 Ron Darling, professional baseball pitcher, World Series player; local St. Johns High School star from Millbury, born in Honolulu
 Dorothea Dix, social reformer; activist
 Ralph Earl, famous portrait painter, artist of early America
 Fannie Farmer, cookbook author
 Abby Kelley Foster, radical abolitionist, women's suffrage
 Robert H. Goddard, father of American rocketry
 Ryan Gomes, NBA player; attended Notre Dame Preparatory School
 Gabby Hartnett, greatest baseball catcher before Johnny Bench
 Abbie Hoffman, activist
 Elias Howe, invented the sewing machine
 Elliott P. Joslin, pioneer diabetes researcher and clinician; founded Joslin Clinic
 Walker Lewis, black abolitionist, Masonic Grand Master of African Grand Lodge #1, Mormon elder
 Connie Mack, baseball great and long-time baseball manager
 Nora Marlowe, character actress; best known for role on The Waltons
 Agnes Moorehead, actress
 William T. G. Morton, contributor to modern anaesthesia
 Francis Patrick O'Connor, associate justice on Massachusetts Supreme Court
 Frank O'Hara, avant-garde poet and playwright
 Jeannine Oppewall, Hollywood producer, film art, four Academy Award nominations including Bridges of Madison County
 Joe Perry, songwriter and guitarist with Aerosmith; he was from Hopedale, and played his first gig at Mendon
 Amos Singletary, Anti-Federalist mill operator, justice for the peace, and state representative
 Brian Skerry, underwater photographer for National Geographic
 Steve Spagnuolo, former head coach of the St. Louis Rams, currently the defensive coordinator for the New York Giants
 Lysander Spooner, pamphleteer, lawyer, abolitionist and political theorist
 Lucy Stone, famous suffragist, women's rights advocate, abolitionist, public speaker, first woman college grad in Massachusetts; first woman to retain her own name after marriage
 Lydia Chapin Taft, America's first woman voter; first colonial woman who voted legally in America
 Earl Tupper, a New Hampshire native, who pioneered Tupperware in Farnumsville, South Grafton, in the 1940s
 Hiram Walker, distillery founder
 Artemas Ward, major general of the American Revolution; the first Supreme Allied Commander of the Continental Army
 Daniel B. Wesson, co-founder of Smith & Wesson, a major firearm manufacturer
 Eli Whitney, invented the cotton gin
 Scott Young, NHL professional hockey player, two-time Stanley Cup champion, United States Olympian; attended St. Mark's and Boston University
 Geoffrey Zakarian, Iron Chef and restaurateur  
 Rich Gedman, Catcher for Boston Red sox, Born Worcester, Ma

See also

 List of Massachusetts locations by per capita income
List of counties in Massachusetts
 Registry of Deeds (Massachusetts) Worcester County District Registry of Deeds
 National Register of Historic Places listings in Worcester County, Massachusetts

References

Further reading

 Mary Babson Fuhrer, A Crisis of Community: The Trials and Transformation of a New England Town, 1815-1848. Chapel Hill, NC: University of North Carolina Press, 2014.

External links

 Worcester County Sheriff
 Worcester County District Attorney's Office
 Worcester District Registry of Deeds
 League of Women Voters page on counties
 Map of cities and towns of Massachusetts
 Video guide to Worcester County (Worcester Love)
 Hampshire Council of Governments
 Worcester County 4 H Fair
 Worcester County Conservation District

 
Massachusetts counties
Counties in Greater Boston
Worcester, MA–CT metropolitan area
1731 establishments in Massachusetts
Populated places established in 1731
1998 disestablishments in Massachusetts
Populated places disestablished in 1998